Eucalyptus cylindriflora, commonly known as the white mallee or goldfields white mallee, is a species of mallee that is endemic to the southwest of Western Australia. It has smooth bark, glossy green, linear adult leaves, flower buds in groups of seven, creamy white flowers and cylindrical to cup-shaped fruit.

Description
It has smooth white to greyish bark. Flowering occurs from December to March and the flowers are creamy white.

Taxonomy and naming
Eucalyptus cylindriflora was first formally described in 1925 by Joseph Maiden and William Blakely from a specimen collected by Charles Gardner near Bendering, growing with Melaleuca uncinata. The description was published in Journal and Proceedings of the Royal Society of New South Wales. The specific epithet (cylindriflora) is derived from Latin and refers to the cylinder-shaped flower buds of this species.

Distribution and habitat
White mallee is found on sandplains on the south western Goldfields-Esperance , Wheatbelt and Great Southern regions of Western Australia growing in mallee shrubland in sandy or clay sand soils with lateritic gravel.

Conservation status
This mallee is classified as "not threatened" by the Western Australian Government Department of Parks and Wildlife.

See also
List of Eucalyptus species

References

cylindriflora
Endemic flora of Western Australia
Mallees (habit)
Myrtales of Australia
Plants described in 1925
Taxa named by Joseph Maiden
Taxa named by William Blakely